USS Mist has been the name of more than one United States Navy ship, and may refer to:

, a steamer in commission from March to August 1865
, a patrol vessel in commission from 1917 to 1919
, a patrol vessel in commission from 1942 to 1943, started life as the fishing trawler Mist, though it did not bear that name as a naval vessel

Mist